This is a list of notable events in country music that took place in the year 2001.

Events

Top hits of the year
The following songs placed within the Top 20 on the Hot Country Songs charts in 2001:

Top new album releases
The following albums placed within the Top 50 on the Top Country Albums charts in 2001:

Other top albums

Deaths
February 1 — John Jarrard, 47, songwriter (respiratory failure)
February 7 — Dale Evans, 88, writer, actress, singer-songwriter, and wife of singing cowboy Roy Rogers
April 8 — Van Stephenson, 47, guitarist, vocalist and co-founding member of the 1990s group Blackhawk  (skin cancer)
June 4 — John Hartford, 63, singer-songwriter and bluegrass musician (non-Hodgkin Lymphoma)
June 30 — Chet Atkins, 77, guitarist and record producer (colon cancer)
July 3 — Johnny Russell, 61, singer-songwriter best known for writing the Buck Owens classic "Act Naturally" (diabetes)
July 22 – Bob Ferguson, 73, record producer and songwriter, best known for work with Porter Wagoner and Dolly Parton (cancer).
September 11 — Carolyn Mayer Beug, 48, filmmaker and music video director who directed three music videos for Dwight Yoakam (killed when American Airlines Flight 11 crashed into World Trade Center)
 December 3 – Grady Martin, 72, session guitarist and member of Nashville's "A Team" (heart attack)

Hall of Fame inductees

Bluegrass Music Hall of Fame inductees
The Carter Family
A. P. Carter
Sara Carter
Maybelle Carter

Country Music Hall of Fame inductees
Bill Anderson (born 1937)
The Delmore Brothers (Alton Delmore 1908–1964 and Rabon Delmore 1916–1952)
The Everly Brothers (Don Everly born 1937 and Phil Everly born 1939)
Don Gibson (1928–2003)
Homer and Jethro (Homer Haynes 1920–1971 and Jethro Burns 1920–1989)
Waylon Jennings (1937–2002)
The Jordanaires (Gordon Stoker born 1924, Neal Matthews, Jr. 1929–2000, Hoyt Hawkins 1927–1982 and Ray Walker born 1934)
Don Law (1902–1982)
The Louvin Brothers (Ira Louvin 1924–1965 and Charlie Louvin born 1927)
Ken Nelson (born 1911)
Sam Phillips (1923–2003)
Webb Pierce (1921–1991)

Canadian Country Music Hall of Fame inductees
Gordon Lightfoot
Gary Buck

Major awards

Grammy Awards
Best Female Country Vocal Performance — "Shine", Dolly Parton
Best Male Country Vocal Performance — "O Death", Ralph Stanley
Best Country Performance by a Duo or Group with Vocal — "The Lucky One", Alison Krauss & Union Station
Best Country Collaboration with Vocals — "I am a Man of Constant Sorrow", Harley Allen, Pat Enright and Dan Tyminski
Best Country Instrumental Performance — "Foggy Mountain Breakdown", Jerry Douglas, Gen Duncan, Vince Gill, Albert Lee, Steve Martin, Leon Russell, Earl Scruggs, Gary Scruggs, Randy Scruggs, Paul Shaffer & Marty Stuart
Best Country Song — "The Lucky One", Alison Krauss & Union Station
Best Country Album — Hank Williams Tribute, Various Artists (Producers: Bonnie Garner, Luke Lewis and Mary Martin)
Best Bluegrass Album — New Favorite, Alison Krauss & Union Station

Juno Awards
Best Country Artist/Group — Carolyn Dawn Johnson
Best New Country Artist/Group — The Ennis Sisters

Academy of Country Music
Entertainer of the Year — Brooks & Dunn
Song of the Year — "Where Were You (When the World Stopped Turning)", Alan Jackson
Single of the Year — "Where Were You (When the World Stopped Turning)", Alan Jackson
Album of the Year — O Brother, Where Art Thou?
Top Male Vocalist — Alan Jackson
Top Female Vocalist — Martina McBride
Top Vocal Duo — Brooks & Dunn
Top Vocal Group — Lonestar
Top New Male Vocalist — Phil Vassar
Top New Female Vocalist — Carolyn Dawn Johnson
Top New Vocal Duo or Group — Trick Pony
Video of the Year — "Only in America", Brooks & Dunn (Director: Michael Merriman)
Vocal Event of the Year — "I am a Man of Constant Sorrow", Various Artists

ARIA Awards 
(presented in Sydney on October 30, 2001)
Best Country Album - Looking Forward Looking Back (Slim Dusty)

Canadian Country Music Association
Telus Mobility Fans' Choice Award — Terri Clark
Male Artist of the Year — Jason McCoy
Female Artist of the Year — Carolyn Dawn Johnson
Group or Duo of the Year — The Wilkinsons
SOCAN Song of the Year — "Complicated", Carolyn Dawn Johnson
Single of the Year — "Complicated", Carolyn Dawn Johnson
Album of the Year — Room with a View, Carolyn Dawn Johnson
Top Selling Album — Breathe, Faith Hill
Video of the Year — "No Fear", Terri Clark
Chevy Trucks Rising Star Award — Carolyn Dawn Johnson
Roots Artist or Group of the Year — Natalie MacMaster

Country Music Association
Entertainer of the Year — Tim McGraw
Song of the Year — "Murder on Music Row", Larry Cordle, Larry Shell
Single of the Year — "I am a Man of Constant Sorrow", The Soggy Bottom Boys
Album of the Year — O Brother, Where Art Thou?
Male Vocalist of the Year — Toby Keith
Female Vocalist of the Year — Lee Ann Womack
Vocal Duo of the Year — Brooks & Dunn
Vocal Group of the Year — Lonestar
Horizon Award — Keith Urban
Music Video of the Year — "Born to Fly", Sara Evans (Director: Peter Zavadil)
Vocal Event of the Year — "Too Country", Brad Paisley (with George Jones, Bill Anderson and Buck Owens)
Musician of the Year — Dann Huff

References

Further reading
Whitburn, Joel, "Top Country Songs 1944–2005 – 6th Edition." 2005.

Other links
Country Music Association
Inductees of the Country Music Hall of Fame

External links
Country Music Hall of Fame

Country
Country music by year